Namecheap is an ICANN-accredited domain name registrar and web hosting company, based in Phoenix, Arizona. The company was founded in 2000 by Richard Kirkendall and has since grown to become one of the largest independent domain registrars in the world, with over 10 million customers and over 77 million domains under management.

Namecheap offers domain name services, including domain registration, transfer, and renewal, as well as domain privacy protection and other value-added services. In addition, Namecheap also offers web hosting solutions, including shared hosting, VPS hosting, and dedicated servers.

Namecheap is a supporter of various non-profit organizations and causes, such as the Electronic Frontier Foundation (EFF) and the Fight for the Future.

Namecheap has been accepting Bitcoin as a payment method since March 2013.

On 15 February 2023, Delhi High Court ordered Indian IT Ministry to block Namecheap and other domain registrars over cybersquatting and not complying with Indian IT Rules, 2021.

Advocacy

ICANN price caps decision
In July 2019, Namecheap was one of the organizations that filed a reconsideration request to ICANN asking for a review of the decision to remove price caps on .org and .info TLDs. As of September 2019, ICANN has ignored such requests.

Termination of service to Russian accounts
In February 2022, Namecheap announced that they would terminate services to Russian accounts due to the Russian invasion of Ukraine, citing "war crimes and human rights violations". Existing users were given a one-week grace period to move their domains. The company also announced that it would be offering free anonymous domain registration and web hosting to all protest and anti-war websites in Russia or Belarus. Namecheap at the same time said it had over 1,000 employees located in Ukraine, comprising most of its support staff, mostly in Kharkiv (which was a major location of fighting).

References

External links
 

Internet properties established in 2000
Companies based in Los Angeles
Domain name registrars
Web hosting